Virginia Beach Public Library (VBPL), located in Virginia Beach, Virginia is a comprehensive library system serving Virginia Beach, an independent city with a population of 450,000 in the Hampton Roads metropolitan area of Virginia. The library supports the educational and leisure needs of citizens with a system of area libraries, a bookmobile, a virtual library, the Wahab Public Law Library, the Municipal Reference Library, and the Library and Resource Center for the Blind and Visually Impaired (DBVI). The collection contains more than 1 million print and non-print items.

Branches 
VBPL has 11 locations including a joint-use library with a community college, a law library, and a bookmobile for early literacy outreach.  The different library buildings range in size from the large  Central Library on busy Virginia Beach Boulevard to the much smaller Pungo-Blackwater Library attached to Creeds Elementary School on Princess Anne Road.  Library locations included:  Central Library, Bayside Special Service Library, Great Neck Area Library, Kempsville Area Library, Oceanfront Area Library, Princess Anne Area Library, Pungo-Blackwater Library, TCC/City Joint-Use Library, Windsor Woods Area Library. On December 10, 2008, just before Meyera E. Oberndorf's 21-year run as city mayor ended, the city council unanimously voted to rename the city's Central Library the Meyera E. Oberndorf Central Library.

Reference and information services 
VBPL offers citizens multiple ways to ask the library for assistance:  telephone, in person, email.  Telephone, in person and email assistance are available during normal library hours.

Governance and support 
The library is governed by a 13-member Advisory Board which is appointed by City Council and includes city, school and teen members. In addition to the funding provided by the city and the state, the library is supported by the Friends of the Virginia Beach Public Library.  The Friends provide approximately $100,000 of annual funding for library programs. The Virginia Beach Public Library Foundation, with assets of over $1 million, also supports the Library by funding large initiatives such as Ready to Learn and the International Language Collection.

Special Collections

Grants Collection
The Grants Collection of print and electronic resources providing access to essential information related to grantsmanship, educational and research funding, as well as literature on proposal-writing, fundraising, nonprofit management, and philanthropy.  Part of the Grants Collection is a cooperating collection of the Foundation Center, an independent national service organization in New York.  Due to licensing restrictions, this cooperating collection is available only at the Virginia Beach Central Library.  In addition, the Grants Resource Center includes other materials in both print and electronic format on scholarships, fellowships, grants, and other funding opportunities for individuals and nonprofit organizations from private, corporate, and federal funding agencies.

International Language Collection
The International Language Collection includes books, spoken recordings, and DVDs in the following languages:  Spanish, Tagalog, French, German, Russian, Japanese and Latin. These materials are available at the Central, Bayside, Great Neck, Kempsville, Oceanfront, Princess Anne, and Pungo Blackwater Libraries.

Services offered

Ask the Library: Patrons can contact librarians with questions through telephone, email, text message and in person
 
Accessible Services: Library provides assistance with technology, audiobooks, large print books, mobility scooters, BARD, talking books. Library also provides Everybody Reads Newsletter and Seeing Beyond Support Group

My Account: Every library account is unique and is managed separately. If a user replaces their library card they also have to update their library account
 
Computers and Internet Access: Every library provides computers that can be used by the public
 
Technology Education: the Library provides computer classes and assistance with online research sources

Technology Services: The Virginia Beach Library System offers public access to 3D printing machines at the following branches; Bayside Area Library, Great Neck Area Library, Meyera E. Oberndorf Central Library, and TCC/City Joint-Use Library. Anyone with a valid Virginia Beach Public Library card has access to 3D printing technology.

Mission 
The mission of the Virginia Beach Public Libraries provide diverse opportunities for learning and gathering that promote personal fulfillment, self-reliance and a sense of community, provide free and convenient access to accurate and current information and materials, and promote reading as a critical life skill and enjoyable activity for the entire Virginia Beach community.

Notes

External links

Virginia Beach Public Library
Online Catalog
Online Reference Sources
Library Programs
Ask VBPL
Library Hours and Directions
Local History
City of Virginia Beach

Public libraries in Virginia
Education in Virginia Beach, Virginia
1930 establishments in Virginia
Libraries established in 1930